Definitive stamps of the Soviet Union were the regular postage stamp issues produced in the USSR between 1923 and 1992.

First definitive issue 

The first issue of the Soviet Union definitive stamps appeared in October 1923. It was known as the Gold Standard issue. Its stamps bore the busts of the worker, Red Army man and peasant. In the period between 1923 and 1926, the worker and soldier designs were placed  on thirteen stamps each and that of the peasant on ten stamps.

Other notable issues 
In 1929, the third set of definitive stamps was issued. They had new images of the male and female workers, male and female collective-farm workers, and Red Army soldier, reflecting the crucial changes in Soviet society due to industrialisation, collectivisation, and equal women's rights. Depiction of the female worker and female collective-farm worker next to their male counterparts in this series was the first appearance of women on Soviet stamps.

With the progress of the socialistic economic programs, the representation of the major groups of Soviet society changed, moving from the more generic image of the earlier period. The worker was shown in the fifth issue of March 1939 as a steel foundryman and in the sixth issue of August 1939 as a miner.

The last definitive series that begun in the Stalin period was the eighth issue (May 1948 to July 1957). It was remarkable by the fact that the scientist was for the first time portrayed on Soviet definitive stamps. In 1958, the engineer design appeared meaning that representatives of other Soviet labouring groups were also depicted on stamps. In 1961, a definitive stamp with the combine worker appeared.

Summary of all issues 
This table represents an outline of the overall USSR definitive issues produced in the Soviet and post-Soviet times (1923 – 1992).

See also

Notes

References

External links 

 

Postage stamps of the Soviet Union
Lists of postage stamps
1923 introductions